Benimaclet is a former village which is now part of the city of Valencia, Spain. The placename is of Arabic origin dating from Moorish times (Arabic بني مخلد, banī Maḫlad, "sons of Majlad"). It is located in the north east of the city and borders the districts of Orriols in the west, Alboraia in the north, the University of Valencia district in the East and the Primat Reig area in the south. Benimaclet is, by extension, the name of the postal district 46020 of the city of Valencia. This postal district unites the district with the recently urbanised neighbouring areas such as the Polytechnic University of Valencia district, which is known locally as camí de Vera. Extensive building in the last 30 years has meant that the final parts of the rural area known as l'horta have vanished in Benimaclet in recent years.

History
Modern Benimaclet has been completely absorbed by Valencia city, however it has historically been proud of its own identity, with its own church, main square and a street layout more reminiscent of a small village than a city district. Old notices in some streets still speak of “The town of Benimaclet.” From the end of the 16th century until 1878, Benimaclet was an independent local council having its own mayor after which it became part of the city of Valencia. The last vestiges of local sovereignty ended in 1970.

It is the district in which most students live mainly due to its proximity to the University campuses. It also contains a large number of local associations and groups such as the Residents association of Benimaclet or the numerous fallas committees (casals fallers). It is also one of the districts in the city where a large number of people majority speak Valencian in daily life, and it is also considered by some as the most important focal point of young Valencian nationalism in Valencia city, with activities and festivals like the Benimaclet carnival season (Carnestoltes).

The area has also become increasingly popular with immigrants due to its relatively low cost housing and local businesses now include an immigrant advice and assistance centre, Ukrainian video store, a Russian supermarket, an Algerian butchers and various locutorios (cheap phone call centres which often offer internet facilities as well.)

Since 1995 Benimaclet has been connected to central Valencia by the metro stations of Benimaclet and Machado. Additionally a tram network was opened in 1994 which connects Benimaclet to the beach area at Las Arenas/Malvarosa and to outlying suburbs and towns in the north west such as Valterna and La Coma.

References

External links 
Benimaclet Entra - Cultural Agenda of Benimaclet

Geography of Valencia